Joculator eudeli is a species of minute sea snails, marine gastropod molluscs in the family Cerithiopsidae. It was described by Jay and Drivas in 2002.

References

Gastropods described in 2002
eudeli